Tetramorium hungaricum is a species of ant in the family Formicidae found in Hungary, eastern Austria and Trassylvania, Central Europe. It occurs in grasslands of dry, south-exposed limestine or dolomitic slopes, also on sandy grasslands. Colonies tend to contain few to several (rarely up to few hundred) queens.

Sources
 Csősz S, Markó B 2004. Redescription of Tetramorium hungaricum Röszler, 1935, a related species of T. caespitum (Linnaeus, 1758) (Hymenoptera: Formicidae) Myrmecologische Nachrichten 6: 49–59..

hungaricum
Hymenoptera of Europe
Insects described in 1935